Paty do Alferes is a municipality located in the Brazilian state of Rio de Janeiro.

References

Municipalities in Rio de Janeiro (state)